Verdun-Le-Rozelier Airport  is a regional airport in France, located  southeast of Verdun  (Departement de la Meuse, Lorraine),  east-northeast of Paris

It supports general aviation with no commercial airline service scheduled.

History
Le-Rozelier Airport is a modern, well-equipped general aviation airport.   On the south side of the runway appears to be the remains of a wartime taxiway, along with concrete footers of long-dismantled wartime buildings, probably aircraft shelters.     On the north side appears to be the remains of a wartime parking ramp and part of a taxiway.

References

External links

Airports in Grand Est